The Battle of San Juan de Ulúa may refer to:

Battle of San Juan de Ulúa (1568)
Battle of San Juan de Ulúa (1838)